Israel–Ukraine relations are foreign relations between Israel and Ukraine. Both countries recognized each other de facto on 11 May 1949 as the Ukrainian SSR and established de jure diplomatic relations on 26 December 1991 as an independent state. Israel has an embassy in Kyiv. Ukraine has an embassy in Tel Aviv and a consulate-general in Haifa. With more than 500,000 Ukrainians settled in Israel, they form the largest foreign community in the country. Ukraine has one of the largest Jewish communities in Europe; estimates of its size vary greatly, ranging from 70,000 to 400,000.

Ukraine is also the first state, apart from Israel, to have had both a Jewish president and a Jewish prime minister simultaneously.

History

When Ukraine was part of the Soviet Union as the Ukrainian SSR, it was one of the 33 states that voted for a Jewish state in the Mandatory Palestine during the UN Partition Plan in 1947. Later, the Soviet Union broke off relations with Israel in 1967 after the Six-Day War and restored diplomatic relations in 1991.

Ukraine is associated with the Holocaust as the site of Babi Yar. A special tourism program for Jews and Israelis was developed in cooperation with the Lviv Municipality and the District Administration, includes visits to Jewish memorial sites and architecture, operated by Hebrew speaking tourist guides.

In July 2010 the foreign ministers of two countries signed an agreement of non visa traffic between Israel and Ukraine. This came into effect on 9 February 2011 and since then Ukrainians and Israelis may enter territory, travel through or stay on Ukraine or Israel without having to obtain visas for 90 days within a period of 180 days. Ukrainian President Petro Poroshenko stated in September 2016 that this visa-free regime had increased tourist flow between two countries tenfold. In November 2014, Oleg Vyshniakov, a Ukrainian entrepreneur and public figure, was appointed to Israel's honorary consul in western Ukraine. In May 2015 he was inaugurated as honorary consul of Israel in Lviv.

In May 2015, two direct Lviv-Tel Aviv-Lviv flights a week were initiated, operated by Ukraine International Airlines. The Israeli government said it did not vote in support of Ukraine against Russian aggression in 2014 due to a public workers strike.

In December 2016, Ukraine as a non-permanent member of United Nations Security Council voted in favor of resolution 2334, which criticised Israel's settlement policy in the West Bank territories. The Ukrainian Foreign Ministry considered the Resolution's text balanced since it also urged the Palestinian side to adopt measures to counter terrorism and Ukraine's ambassador to the United Nations Volodymyr Yelchenko compared Israel's settlement of the West Bank to the Russian occupation of Crimea. Israel in reaction cancelled a planned visit of the Ukrainian prime minister in Israel.

There are over 500,000 Ukrainians who live in Israel, making up the largest foreign community in the country. At the same time, Ukraine has one of the world's largest Jewish communities; estimates of its size vary widely, from at least 70,000 individuals up to 400,000 individuals.

Ukraine is an important destination for Jewish tourism, as many Jewish saints are buried there. Each year, on Rosh HaShanah, more than 40,000 Jewish tourists come to the city of Uman, in what is known as the Rosh Hashana kibbutz, this being a large source of revenue for the city.

2022 Russian invasion of Ukraine 

In February 2022, Israeli Foreign Minister Yair Lapid and Israeli Prime Minister Naftali Bennett expressed support for Ukraine following the Russian military invasion of the country. Despite not repeating Lapid's condemnation of Russia after invasion took place, Bennett expressed support for Ukraine, stating "our hearts are with the civilians who through no fault of their own have been thrust into this situation," and also offered humanitarian assistance to the Ukrainians and help to Jews who wanted to leave Ukraine.  Bennet is hesitant to assign blame on Russia due to their presence in Syria, saying only that there would be "continued regular discussions and assessments of the situation to evaluate future consequences (to the extent that there are any) for Israel."  On 23 February 2022, the day before the invasion took place, Lapid stated that Israel would support territorial integrity and sovereignty.

On February 25, 2022, Ukrainian President Volodymyr Zelenskyy requested Israeli Prime Minister Naftali Bennett to mediate in the confrontation with Russia, according to the Ukrainian envoy to Israel. On 5 March 2022, Prime Minister Bennett flew to Moscow and held a three-hour meeting with Putin about the situation in Ukraine, after which Bennett spoke to Zelenskyy by phone and flew to Germany to meet with Chancellor Olaf Scholz. Bennett also brought up the subject of the significant Jewish community caught up in the Ukraine conflict during their three-hour discussion in the Kremlin, according to the Israeli source.

On March 11, 2022, Ukraine's ambassador urged Israel to increase its support for the country by penalizing Moscow, absorbing more Ukrainian refugees, and supplying military weapons.

On March 20, 2022, In a speech to Ukraine's parliament, President Volodymyr Zelenskyy chastised Israel, asking why it was not deploying missile defenses or condemning Russia for its incursion. In response to Zelenskyy, Israeli Foreign Minister Yair Lapid said in a statement that Israel would continue to help Ukraine's people "as much as we can." Israel has sent a field hospital and other humanitarian aid to Ukraine.

On July 3, 2022, the Israeli Supreme Court abolished the quotas on Ukrainian refugees in Israel and allowed unlimited entry of refugees into Israel. The President of Ukraine welcomed the decision and said is a sign of "a true, developed democracy"

On October 26, 2022, the president of Ukraine said that relations between Israel and Ukraine are warming up and are in a positive trend due to Israeli intelligence assistance to Ukraine about the Iranian drones in the Russian invasion.

It is estimated that around 15,000 Ukrainian refugees are living in Israel, of which around 5,000 are of Jewish origin, qualifying for Israeli citizenship.

Economic relations
In 2012, the bilateral trade turnover between the countries was 1.3 billion dollars, a growth of 49.1% in comparison to 2011. The total export of Ukraine was 922.5 million dollars (796.4 in products and 126.1 in services). The import reached the amount of 364.2 million dollars (266.8 in goods and 97.4 in services). The main exports from Ukraine to Israel in 2012 were: grain (50.6%), non-precious metal (18.2%), aircraft (6.9%), food industry byproducts (5.8%), oil seeds and oleaginous fruits (3.3%), fats and oils of animal or vegetable origin (1.5%), electrical machinery (1.2%), nuclear reactors, boilers, machinery (1.1%). The main Israeli imports to Ukraine in 2012 were: mineral fuels, mineral oils and products of their distillation (42.4%), various chemical products (9.0%), plastics (7.0%), goods purchased in ports (5.5%), pharmaceutical products (4.8%), electrical machinery (4.4%), nuclear reactors, boilers, machinery (4.1%), fruits and nuts (3.1%), optical: photographic equipment (2.2%), soap: organic surface-active substances (1.9%), synthetic or artificial (1.7%), vegetables (1.6%), essential oils (1.5%).

Israel Foreign Trade Administration at the Ministry of Economy operates an Economic & Trade Mission in Kyiv. Its main goal is the promotion of trade and export by assisting Israeli industry expanding in the Ukrainian market, supporting individual exporters in marketing activity in Ukraine, attracting investment and expansion of strategic cooperation with Ukraine, improving knowledge of the Ukrainian business of Israeli industry and economy and helping in solving problems arising for Israeli companies operating in Ukraine. The economic attaché in Ukraine is Elizabeth Solovyov. Israel's honorary consul in western Ukraine, Oleg Vyshniakov, established an inter-ministerial committee for Ukrainian-Israeli trade and economic cooperation, as well as an economic business forum, which launched in November 2015 in Kyiv. Leading developers in the fields of Industry and Trade in Ukraine and Israel are taking part of this program.

Ukraine has been Israel's main wheat supplier for many years, accounting for almost half of the country's wheat consumption. As of 2022, Israel imports corn and corn products, barley, rapeseed and soybeans. Agricultural exports to Israel exceed $400 million a year.

State visits
Ukrainian President Petro Poroshenko paid a state visit to Israel on 22 December 2015, where he met with Israeli President Reuven Rivlin and Prime Minister Benjamin Netanyahu and addressed the Knesset. Rivlin visited Ukraine in September 2016.

In 2021, Israeli President Isaac Herzog paid a state visit to Ukraine. During the visit, Herzog, Ukrainian President Volodymyr Zelenskyy, and German President Frank-Walter Steinmeier attended the inauguration of a memorial to victims of Babyn Yar on the 80th anniversary of the Nazi massacre of 33,000 Jews in a ravine near Kyiv in September 1941.

Notable incidents 
 Siberia Airlines Flight 1812 – Ukrainian accidental attack on a civilian plane from Tel Aviv 
 Dirar Abu Seesi abduction

See also  
 Foreign relations of Israel 
 Foreign relations of Ukraine 
 History of the Jews in Ukraine
 List of Ukrainian Jews
 Israel–Russia relations

References

External links  
 Israeli embassy in Kyiv 
 Ukrainian embassy in Tel Aviv (new version of the website) 
 Ukrainian embassy in Tel Aviv (old version of the website) 
 Website of the Israeli honorary consulate in the Western Ukraine  
 Israeli Ministry of Foreign Affairs considers budget increasing possibility on humanitarian projects for Ukraine. in Interfax-Ukraine, 3 November 2015

 

 
Ukraine
Bilateral relations of Ukraine